New Take: Best Collections '92 is a remix album by Japanese singer Yōko Oginome. Released through Victor Entertainment on December 16, 1991, the album features re-recordings and remixes of Oginome's past singles, as well as select B-sides.

The album peaked at No. 48 on Oricon's albums chart. It also sold over 21,000 copies.

Track listing

Charts

References

External links
 
 

1991 remix albums
Yōko Oginome compilation albums
Japanese-language compilation albums
Victor Entertainment compilation albums